Baron Revelstoke, of Membland in the County of Devon, is a title in the Peerage of the United Kingdom. It was created on 30 June 1885 for the businessman Edward Baring, head of the family firm of Barings Bank and a member of the Baring family. Baring was the son of Henry Baring, third son of Sir Francis Baring, 1st Baronet, and the nephew of Alexander Baring, 1st Baron Ashburton, the second cousin of Francis Baring, 1st Baron Northbrook, the elder brother of Evelyn Baring, 1st Earl of Cromer and the uncle of Evelyn Baring, 1st Baron Howick of Glendale. He was succeeded by his second but eldest surviving son John, the second Baron. John was a partner in Baring Brothers and Co. Ltd, a Director of the Bank of England, and also served as Lord Lieutenant of Middlesex. On his death the title passed to his younger brother Cecil, the third Baron. He acquired Lambay Island, north of Dublin, in 1904.  the title is held by his great-grandson, the seventh Baron, who succeeded his father in 2012.

The man-of-letters Maurice Baring was the fifth son of the first Baron.

The city of Revelstoke in British Columbia, Canada, was renamed in honour of Edward Charles Baring, 1st Baron Revelstoke, commemorating his role in securing the financing necessary for completion of the Canadian Pacific Railway.

The family seat is Lambay Castle, in Lambay Island, County Dublin.

Barons Revelstoke (1885)
Edward Charles Baring, 1st Baron Revelstoke (1828–1897)
John Baring, 2nd Baron Revelstoke (1863–1929)
Cecil Baring, 3rd Baron Revelstoke (1864–1934). Married Maude Lorillard of New York, daughter of the tobacco millionaire, Pierre Lorillard IV.
Rupert Baring, 4th Baron Revelstoke (1911–1994)
John Baring, 5th Baron Revelstoke (1934–2003)
James Cecil Baring, 6th Baron Revelstoke (1938–2012)
Alexander Rupert Baring, 7th Baron Revelstoke (b. 1970)

The heir presumptive is the present holder's brother Thomas James Baring (b. 1971)

Family tree

Line of Succession

  Edward Charles Baring, 1st Baron Revelstoke (1828—1897)
  John Baring, 2nd Baron Revelstoke (1863—1929)
  Cecil Baring, 3rd Baron Revelstoke (1864—1934)
  Rupert Baring, 4th Baron Revelstoke (1911—1994)
  John Baring, 5th Baron Revelstoke (1934—2003)
  James Cecil Baring, 6th Baron Revelstoke (1938—2012)
  Alexander Rupert Baring, 7th Baron Revelstoke (born 1970)
 (1) Hon. Thomas James Baring (b. 1971)
 Major Hon. Hugo Baring (1876—1949)
 Francis Anthony Baring (1909—1940)
 (2) Nicholas Hugo Baring (b. 1934)
 (3) Francis Charles Baring (b. 1973)
 (4) Tobias Keith Alexander Baring (b. 1976)
 (5) Edward Randal Baring (b. 1979)
 (6) Peter Baring (b. 1935)
 (7) Guy Francis Baring (b. 1965)
 (8) Max Maurice Baring (b. 1967)
 (9) Hugo John Baring (b. 1970)
 (10) Francis Baring (b. 1999)
 (11) Jim Baring (b. 2003)
 (12) William Ajax Baring (b. 2004)

See also
Baron Northbrook
Baron Ashburton
Earl of Cromer
Baron Howick of Glendale
City of Revelstoke

Arms

Notes

References

Baronies in the Peerage of the United Kingdom
Noble titles created in 1885
Revelstoke